Billabong is an Australian term for an oxbow lake, an isolated crescentic pond left behind after a river loop is cut off when the river channel changes course. Billabongs are usually formed when the path of a creek or river changes due to bank erosion, leaving the former channel deprived of further inflow and becoming a dead-end gully holding only residual water that has not yet drained or evaporated.  As a result of the arid climate of many parts of Australia, these "dead rivers" often fill with water seasonally but can be dry for a greater part of the year.

Etymology
The etymology of the word billabong is disputed. The word is most likely derived from the Wiradjuri term bilabaŋ, which means "a watercourse that runs only after rain". It is derived from bila, meaning "river", It may have been combined with bong or bung, meaning "dead". One source, however, claims that the term is of Scottish Gaelic origin.

Billabongs are significant because they do not have outflow and can hold water longer than sections of rivers especially during drier season, thus serving important ecological functions as waterholes and habitats for semiaquatic animals such as frogs. In the older days, these were important landmarks for people to identify and many billabongs were namesaked by the local areas.

References in Australian culture

In literature 

Banjo Paterson's popular song "Waltzing Matilda" is set beside a billabong. 

Mary Grant Bruce wrote a series of books, known as The Billabong Series, depicting the adventures of the Linton family, who live at Billabong station from around 1911 until the late 1920s.

In art 
Both Aboriginal Australians and European artists use billabongs as subject matter in painting. For example, Aboriginal painter Tjyllyungoo (Lance Chad) has a watercolour entitled Trees at a billabong.

American avant-garde filmmaker Will Hindle produced a short film titled Billabong in 1969.

In commerce 
Billabong is the name of an Australian brand of sportswear for surf, skateboard, and snowboard.

See also

 Guelta
 Limnology
 Meander

References

External links

Australian English
Lakes

Fluvial landforms